This is the results breakdown of the local elections held in Catalonia on 24 May 2015. The following tables show detailed results in the autonomous community's most populous municipalities, sorted alphabetically.

Opinion polls

Overall

City control
The following table lists party control in the most populous municipalities, including provincial capitals (shown in bold). Gains for a party are displayed with the cell's background shaded in that party's colour.

Municipalities

Badalona
Population: 217,210

Barcelona

Population: 1,602,386

Cornellà de Llobregat
Population: 86,234

Girona
Population: 97,227

L'Hospitalet de Llobregat
Population: 253,518

Lleida
Population: 139,176

Mataró
Population: 124,280

Reus
Population: 104,962

Sabadell
Population: 207,444

Sant Cugat del Vallès
Population: 87,118

Santa Coloma de Gramenet
Population: 118,738

Tarragona
Population: 132,199

Terrassa
Population: 215,517

References

Catalonia
2015